Mantra Gopya is a Kannada language text written by Veerashaiva saint and mystic Allama Prabhu.  It forms an important part of Veerashaiva scriptures.

References

Lingayatism
Kannada literature